Bennett Peak is in the Stikine Region of British Columbia, Canada, near the border with Yukon. The elevation is variously stated as 2,052 meters (6,732 feet) and 2,123 meters (6,965 feet).

Like the nearby ghost town of Bennett, British Columbia and Bennett Lake, the peak is presumably named for James Gordon Bennett, Jr., the editor of the New York Herald and a sponsor of exploration.

See also
Stikine people
One Mile River (Lindemann Creek)

References

Two-thousanders of British Columbia
Stikine Country